The second season of Law & Order: Criminal Intent premiered September 29, 2002 and ended May 18, 2003 on NBC.

Production
Law & Order: Criminal Intent was renewed a second season in May 2002 and production began in Summer 2002. Show runner/executive producer René Balcer became head writer this season, writing every episode of the season.

Peter Jankowski was promoted to executive producer this season; last season Jankowski was a co-executive producer. Co-executive producers this season were Fred Berner, Arthur W. Forney, and Theresa Rebeck with John L. Roman and Michael Kewley serving as producers. Supervising producers were Roz Weinman and Marlane Gomard Meyer. Original Law & Order writer and co-executive producer at the time, Michael S. Chernuchin was consulting producer and Tim DeLuca as associate producer. Mary Rae Thewlis became co-producer starting with the 6th episode, "Malignant". Warren Leight, who later became co-executive producer and then show runner/executive producer, began as a producer with the 10th episode, "Con-Text". Balcer hired Leight from a recommendation by co-executive producer, Theresa Rebeck.

Cast

Primary cast

 Vincent D'Onofrio as Detective Robert Goren
 Kathryn Erbe as Detective Alexandra Eames
 Jamey Sheridan as Captain James Deakins
 Courtney B. Vance as ADA Ron Carver

Recurring cast
 Leslie Hendrix as Chief Medical Examiner Elizabeth Rodgers

Notable guest stars
 Jay O. Sanders as Harry Rowan
 Jim Gaffigan as Russell Matthews
 Tim Guinee as David Bishop
 Liam Aiken as Robbie Bishop
 Lisa Eichhorn as Dr. Leonard
 Olivia d'Abo as Nicole Wallace / Elizabeth Hitchens
 Linda Emond as Dr. Christine Fellowes
 Peter Gerety as George Dawkins
 Daniel London as Mark Bayley
 Reg E. Cathey as Professor Roland Sanders
 David Marshall Grant as Assistant District Attorney Peter Bonham
 Susan Floyd as Attorney Linda Bonham
 Peter Frechette as Stuart Gaston
 Frank Wood as George Weems
 Kim Chan as Mr. Hsu
 Elizabeth Wilson as Lucille Mobray
 Stephen Tobolowsky as Jim Halliwell
 Paul Wesley as Luke Miller
 Deirdre Lovejoy as Penny Halliwell
 Tammy Blanchard as Sarah Eldon
 Merritt Wever as Hannah Price
 Rider Strong as Ethan Edwards
 Linda Lavin as  Ursula Sussman
 Ned Eisenberg as Danny Sussman
 John Benjamin Hickey as Randall Fuller
 Mark Blum as Dr. Philip Oliver
 Karen Black as Vera Morgan
 Lee Tergesen as Keith Ramsey
 Amy Ryan as Julie Turner
 Hal Linden as Mr. Turner
 Christopher Welch as Dr. Thomas Dysart
 Victor Argo as Mr. Garcia
 Mark Linn-Baker as Wally Stevens
 Matthew Arkin as Ben Gergis
 Ken Cheeseman as Leo Gergis
 Isabel Glasser as Elaine Gergis
 Lance Reddick as Jack Bernard
 Tom Atkins as Mr. Monahan 
 Adam Storke as Mark Dietrich
 Mike Starr as Ted Marston
 Joel Grey as Milt Winters
 Josef Sommer as Spencer Durning
 Paul Calderon as Jojo Rios
 Dennis Christopher as Roger Coffman
 Paul Dooley as Stan Coffman
 William Sadler as Kyle Devlin
 James McCaffrey as Daniel Croydon

Episodes

{| class="wikitable plainrowheaders" style="width:100%"
|- style="color:white"
! style="background:#000;"|No. inseries
! style="background:#000;"|No. inseason
! style="background:#000;"|Title
! style="background:#000;"|Directed by
! style="background:#000;"|Written by
! style="background:#000;"|Original air date
! style="background:#000;"|Productioncode
! style="background:#000;"|U.S. viewers(millions)

|}

References

Law & Order: Criminal Intent episodes
2002 American television seasons
2003 American television seasons